István Antal (18 February 1896 – 11 October 1975) was a Hungarian politician, who served as Minister of Religion and Education and as Minister of Justice in 1944. Born in Kenderes, he knew Miklós Horthy from here, who was born here likewise. He fought in the First World War, after his returning from the front he joined several right extremist student organizations. Antal founded the Red-White Bloc firstly, which worked against Mihály Károlyi's republic then the Hungarian Soviet Republic, then he became one of the leaders of the Turul Student Organization. He met Mihály Kolosváry-Borcsa here at first.

Antal soon finished the University of Law. After that he served as press officer of Prime Minister Gyula Gömbös, later became state secretary of the Ministry of Justice. He was member of the Miklós Kállay cabinet from 1942 as Minister without portfolio of National Defence and Propaganda. After the German occupation the new Prime Minister Döme Sztójay appointed him Minister of Justice and Minister of Religion and Education. In these times he actively took a part in creating the newer anti-Jewish laws and its introduction. He did not take part in the governance after the Arrow Cross Party's coup. In addition he was arrested for a short time, because of criticizing Ferenc Szálasi's mental efficiency.

After the Second World War he was sentenced to death for war crimes by the People's Tribune in Budapest, but he was not executed after Mátyás Rákosi's personal intervention. For the second time he was sentenced to life imprisonment. Antal was set free in 1960, lived until his death in retirement. His memoirs were published in 2004.

References
 Magyar Életrajzi Lexikon

1896 births
1975 deaths
People from Kenderes
People from the Kingdom of Hungary
Unity Party (Hungary) politicians
Hungarian fascists
Education ministers of Hungary
Justice ministers of Hungary
Members of the National Assembly of Hungary (1939–1944)
Austro-Hungarian military personnel of World War I
Holocaust perpetrators in Hungary
Hungarian prisoners sentenced to life imprisonment
Prisoners sentenced to life imprisonment by Hungary
Hungarian people convicted of war crimes
Hungarian politicians convicted of crimes